The Río Rosario is a river of Hormigueros, San Germán and Mayagüez in Puerto Rico. 

Skirmishes were fought here during the Spanish-American War.

See also
 Maricao Fish Hatchery: located along the river in Maricao, Puerto Rico
 Torréns Bridge: crosses the river in Hormigueros, Puerto Rico
 List of rivers of Puerto Rico

References

External links

 USGS Hydrologic Unit Map – Caribbean Region (1974)
 Rios de Puerto Rico

Rivers of Puerto Rico